Tingvatn is the administrative centre of Hægebostad municipality in Agder county, Norway. The village is located along the river Lygna, just south of the lake Lygne. The small village of Tingvatn has about 100 residents in it including the southern area which is also known as Birkeland.

References

Villages in Agder
Hægebostad